Adelaide Nathalie Marie Hedwig Philippine d'Affry, Duchess of Castiglione Colonna, known as Marcello, (6 July 1836 – 14 July 1879) was a Swiss artist and sculptor.

Early life 
d'Affry was born in Fribourg and was the eldest daughter of Count Louis d'Affry (1810–1841) and Lucie Maillardoz (1816–1897), the daughter of Philippe Marquis of Maillardoz. 
The d'Affry's were a military family: Louis d'Affry (1743–1810), her great-grandfather, was the first Landammann of Switzerland. 
Count Louis-Auguste-Augustin d'Affry, the great grandfather of Adele, devoted himself to engraving and documenting scenes from military life.
His son, Charles, served under Bonaparte. 
Adèle d'Affry had a younger sister, Cécile Marie Philippine Carolina (1839–1911). After their father died on June 26 1841, Adele and Cécile were raised by their mother. She grew up between Freiburg and Givisiez during the summer months, and Nice or Italy during the winter. Between 1853 and 1854, d'Affry received a classical education, including drawing lessons from Auguste Joseph Dietrich. It was during these years that she took modeling classes in the studio of the Swiss sculptor Heinrich Max Imhof in Rome.

On April 5, 1856, Adèle d'Affry married Carlo Colonna (1825–1856) in Rome. A month later, he was knighted and received the title of Duke of Castiglione-Altibrandi. The marriage was very short as Carlo Colonna died suddenly of typhoid fever in Paris on 18 December 1856. d'Affry was obliged to return to Rome in 1857, to settle a dispute with the Colonna family over her husband's the estate. The Duchess took refuge in the convent of the Ladies of the Sacred Heart, Trinidad des-Monts. 
Her artistic vocation gradually awakened at that time. She took lessons in the workshop of Imhof, visited many churches and admired the works of antiquity and Michelangeo. In the fall of 1857, she modeled the bust of her late husband. This first sculpture was quickly followed by a self-portrait.

In 1859, d'Affry went to Paris and rented an apartment from Léon Riesener (1808–1878), a cousin of Eugėne Delacroix, at No. 1 rue Bayard. Pierre Andrieu (1821–1892), an assistant to Riesener and Delacroix, helped to decorate in fresco the dining room and workshop. 

The Duchess began to frequent the brilliant society of the Second Empire. She chaperoned her sister Cécile until her marriage, on 29 October, to Baron Moritz von Ottenfels-Gschwind (1820–1907), an Austrian diplomat. Her rank in society led d'Affry to frequent the salons of the Faubourg Saint-Germain, and the shows held by the Comtesse de Circourt. The beautiful Duchess built lasting friendships, including with Adolphe Thiers and Auguste Joseph Alphonse Gratry.

Art work
d'Affry worked on her first successful composition, La Belle Hélène (1860). She studied animal drawing at the Natural History Museum under the direction of sculptor Antoine-Louis Barye, and modeled from nature. Auguste Clésinger monitored her progress. From December, she took anatomy classes from Professor Sappey in the basement of the School of Medicine. On September 6 1860, during a dinner at the Barbier, Adele met Eugène Delacroix.

 

In 1861, her application to study at the École nationale supérieure des Beaux-Arts was rejected. Back in Rome, d'Affry admired the Villa Medici group of Ugolino and his children by Jean-Baptiste Carpeaux. The friendship between the two artists only ceased with the death of Carpeaux.

In 1863, d'Affry chose, after much hesitation, to exhibit at the Paris Salon under the pseudonym "Marcello". She had three busts: Bianca Cappello, the Portrait of Count G. N ... [icolaÿ] and the portrait of the Duchess of San C ... [Esario], a work in wax. The success met by her Bianca gained the attention of the Empress Eugenie, who invited her to participate in one of the famous Tuileries Monday. d'Affry was then invited to the court, alongside Napoleon III, whom she greatly admired.

During February 1864, d'Affry received Jean-Baptiste Carpeaux in Givisiez, and rejected the marriage proposal presented by Carpeaux for his son. Marcello exhibited the Gorgon, a marble bust in the 1865 Salon; she received the official order of a portrait of the Empress Eugenie, which was intended to decorate the throne room of the city hall of Paris. d'Affry produced four different versions of this bust.

During the months of June and July, 1866, d'Affry left for London and monitored the reception of her bronze bust of The Gorgon, which was exhibited at the Royal Academy. Her admiration for the queen Marie Antoinette, she shared with the Empress Eugenie, has led her to complete the busts of Marie Antoinette at Versailles and Marie Antoinette at the Temple. She presented to the Salon in Paris in May until November 1866, a bust of the Empress, which was harshly criticized and rejected by the Commission of fine arts of the city of Paris. She feared having fallen out of favor with Eugenie. Eventually, the prefect Haussmann made the decision to accept the bust.

d'Affry presented eight of her works, including Hecate, the Emperor Napoleon III commissioned for the gardens of Compiègne, at the Universal Exhibition of 1867, in the section of the Papal States. Then, accompanied by her mother, she traveled during May and June 1867 across Austria, Germany and Hungary. In Budapest, the two women attended the coronation of Empress Elisabeth. On her return to Paris, d'Affry made a small marble bust of  Elisabeth.

Between March and August 1868, d'Affry traveled in the north of Italy and stopped in Rome. At Cauterets, in the Pyrenees, she crossed the border and traveled to Spain, where she was caught in an insurrection. Despite the dangers of this situation, she remained in Madrid where she worked with her friends, the painters Henri Regnault and Georges Clairin. She met the revolutionary General Milans del Bosch, and she modeled his bust. Letters of recommendation from Prosper Mérimée, opened the doors for her of the Prado Museum. She admired, among others, the works of Diego Velázquez.

From Freiburg, where she lived since January 1876, d'Affry returned to Italy, visiting Florence, Orvieto, Rome, Bologna, Ferrara, Ravenna, Padua, Venice, Verona and Milan. The director of the Uffizi Gallery commissioned a portrait. Her bust of Baroness of Keffenbrinck, presented at the Salon of that year earned her a mere honorable mention.

Illness and death
In 1877, exhausted by her cough and joint pain, d'Affry spent December in Italy, on the advice of her doctors. In 1878, d'Affry moved constantly between Naples, Switzerland and Paris, in search of a climate that would calm her hemoptysis.  

On January 2, a second version of her will listed the sculptures she bequeathed to the State of Fribourg, provided that a museum be dedicated to her work. Based in Castellammare di Stabia in 1879, d'Affry put her papers in order, working on writing her memoirs which were left unfinished. She died of tuberculosis on 14 July 1879.

Works 
 Femme transtévérine, 1874 musée d'Orsay 
 La Marquise de Talenay, 1875, musée d'Orsay 
 Gorgone, 1865, Fribourg, musée d'art et d'histoire
 Pythia, 1870, Paris, Paris Opera. This work serves as the inspiration for a key feature in Fantastic Beasts: The Crimes of Grindelwald.

References

Sources 
 
 
 
 
 Gianna A. Mina (dir.), Marcello, Adèle d'Affry (1836-1879), duchesse de Castiglione Colonna (catalogue d'exposition (Fribourg, MAHF, 7 novembre 2014 – 22 février 2015 ; Ligornetto, Museo Vela, 26 avril – 30 août 2015 ; Musées nationaux du Palais de Compiègne, 16 octobre 2015 – 1er février 2016 ; Pregny-Genève, Musée des Suisses dans le monde, février – juin 2016)), Milan, édition 5 Continents, 2014
 Mélanie Kaeser et Michel Viegnes (éd), Adèle d'Affry "Marcello" Écrits de fiction : nouvelles, théâtre, récits, Fribourg, Presses Littéraires de Fribourg, 2014
 Simone de Reyff (dir.) et Fabien Python (dir.), Les Cahiers d'Adèle, Société d'histoire du canton de Fribourg, coll. « Archives de la Société d'histoire du canton de Fribourg / nouvelle série » (no 17), 2014

External links 

English – Fondation Marcello
Marcello

1836 births
1879 deaths
19th-century Swiss painters
19th-century Swiss sculptors
19th-century Swiss women artists
People from Fribourg
Pseudonymous artists